Leah Balsham (September 28, 1915 – 2015) was an American lithographer and ceramic artist. Balsham took part in the Federal Works Progress Administration. Balsham attended the University of Chicago and the Archie Bray Foundation for the Ceramic Arts. She also traveled to Japan to study. Balsham died in 2015 in Beverly Shores, Indiana.

Collections
Art Institute of Chicago
Metropolitan Museum of Art
Mills College Art Museum
Museum of Modern Art, New York
Newark Museum
Smithsonian American Art Museum

References

External links
 images of Balsham's work from the Metropolitan Museum of Art

1915 births
2015 deaths
20th-century American women artists
21st-century American women artists
American ceramists
American lithographers
American women printmakers
Artists from Philadelphia
Women lithographers
University of Chicago alumni